Anthophora bimaculata (also called green-eyed flower bee) is a species of bees.

Description 
They are 8-9 mm long. The male has narrow light tergite bandages, yellow face and normally hairy middle legs clearly visible in the field. The females are Clypeus yellow, but at the base with 2 large black spots, tergite 4 and 5 gray-yellow tomentose hairs, tergias with light hair ties in the field clearly recognizable. Both genders have olive green complex eyes and one very high, clearly perceptible flight sound. Habitat is important for identification.

Range 
In North Africa from Morocco to Libya; a report by FRIESE (1915) from Eritrea is questionable. From Portugal through southern, central and eastern Europe, Ukraine and southern Russia to eastern Siberia (Central Baikal) and across Asia Minor and the Caucasus to Iran and Kyrgyzstan; north to Central England (allegedly also recently detected in Ireland), Denmark, Latvia, Kirov; south to Sicily (also on Corsica, no evidence from Sardinia), Albania, Bulgaria (no evidence from Greece, Israel and Iran).

In central Europe in all regions in suitable habitats. Generally rare. In Germany from all federal states with the exception of Schleswig-Holstein up-to-date everywhere. Reported from all federal states in Austria with the exception of Salzburg, Tyrol and Vorarlberg. In Switzerland currently from Graubünden and Valais, historically from Lake Geneva, Lake Thun and Lake Biel as well as Ticino, Mesox and Domleschg.

Habitat 
In sandy areas in lower locations: inland dunes and fields of drifting sand, sand pits, sandy embankments and ruderal places, forest edges and forest clearings. Nests on vegetation-free, flat surfaces or in small trailing edges. Nests only in fine and medium sands (drifting sand, weathered sand).

Ecology 
Nests in self-dug cavities in the earth. Nests are found both in early succession stages with only little vegetation cover as also in late stages with heavy coverage. Nests have been found in the root balls of silver grass clusters. A main tunnel is 4-5 cm long deep in the ground. Under favorable conditions in small to large aggregations.

Polylectic species (8 plant families). Known pollen sources are: Asteraceae: Centaurea scabiosa, Centaurea stoebe, Cirsium vulgare, Picris hieracioides, Hypochoeris radicata; Boraginaceae: Echium vulgare, Anchuso officinalis; Campanulaceae: Trifolium arvense; Hypericaceae: Hypericum perforatum; Lamiaceae: Teucrium scorodonia; Lythraceae: Lythrum salicaria; Rosaceae: Potentilla incana. Except for the Hypericum species, all of the above serve both sexes as sources of nectar. Within the pollen loads 3 or 4 different types of pollen can be found. The field observations also showed that the flower visits on a pollen-collecting flight are randomly strung together, depending on the offer.

Parasites: Ammobates punctatus and Coelioxys rufescens are known as cuckoo bees; in England Coelioxys elongata was also observed on the nests.

Phenology: Univoltin. Flight period from the beginning of July to the end of August. Wintering as a resting larva.

Etymology 
From Latin bi- "=" two "and" maculata "=" speckled ".

Taxonomy 
Subgenus Heliophila KLUG, 1807.

Synonyms: Saropoda rotundata (PANZER, 1798); Heliophila bimaculata (PANZER, 1798).

References 

Apinae
Insects described in 1798